Agelena inda is a species of spider in the family Agelenidae, which contains at least 1,315 species of funnel-web spiders . It has been described by Simon, in 1897. It is primarily found in India.

References

inda
Spiders described in 1897
Spiders of the Indian subcontinent